Ankober is an H chondrite meteorite that fell to Earth on July 7, 1942, in Shewa, Ethiopia.

Classification
It is classified as H4-ordinary chondrite.

References

See also 
 Glossary of meteoritics
 Meteorite falls
 Ordinary chondrite

Meteorites found in Ethiopia
1942 in Ethiopia